Cassiel ( Qaṣpīʾēl, "God is my wrath"; also known as קַפְצִיאֵל Qap̄ṣīʾēl, "God is my leap";), is an angel appearing in extracanonical Jewish, Christian, and Islamic mystical and magical works, often as one of the Seven Archangels, the angel of Saturn, and in other roles.

In Jewish mystical literature 

Qafsiel is invoked in an ancient Hebrew charm to tell if an enemy is running away. Gustav Davidson writes that Qafsiel is described as the ruler of the seventh heaven in 3 Enoch, citing Odeberg's edition.  However, Odeberg's edition only states in a footnote that Qafsiel is "(one of) the guardian(s) of the door of the seventh Hall" in Hekhalot Rabbati.  In turn, Qaspiel is described in Hekhalot Rabbati as a guardian of the sixth palace, armed with a lightning-dripping sword (which shouts "Ruin!") as well as a bow, tempests, light, and powerful winds—weapons which he uses against anyone not fit to see God.  Qaspiel is later described in the same work as one of three "guardians of the entrance of the seventh palace," alongside Dumiel and Gabriel.  Qaspiel is also listed in Ma'aseh Merkavah as a guardian of the second palace. Sefer Raziel lists Qafsiel as the prince of Saturn. The Zohar describes Qafsiel as one of the two chief aides (alongside Hizqiel) to Gabriel. Qaspiel is also described as one of the angels of death in Judaism; specifically the angel who presides over the deaths of young men.

In western occult literature 

Cassiel is listed in the related works The Sworn Book of Honorius and in (pseudo)-Peter de Abano's Heptameron (the latter also influenced by Sefer Raziel).  Cassiel's presence in Honorius may also be a result of Greek influence, as he is likewise listed in a Byzantine exorcism manual (as Kasiel).  In these works, he is, as usual, listed as the angel of Saturn but also as the angel of the North and as one of the angels named in the Sigillum Dei.  Following Honorius and the Heptameron, Cassiel appears in the Liber de Angelis as Cassael (again the angel over Saturn), then in various editions of the Key of Solomon as Cassiel or Cassael, angel (sometimes archangel) over Saturn or Saturday, and once again in the Sigillum Dei.  Cassiel is depicted in Francis Barrett's The Magus as a dragon-riding Djinn with a beard, again as the angel over Saturn.

Other works 
Cassiel is sometimes described as the angel of tears and the angel of temperance. As Qafsiel, he is sometimes regarded as the ruler of the moon instead of Saturn.

Averroes and Ibn Arabi likewise listed Saturn as the planetary counterpart of the archangel Kafziel.
Ahmad al-Buni listed Kasfiyail as one of eight angels, among whom each has its own hierarchy of spirits under command.

In popular culture 

Cassiel is the main protagonist in The Outcast Season series by Rachel Caine.
Cassiel appears in Wim Wenders's film Wings of Desire, as well as the U.S. remake, City of Angels. Wenders found the name in an encyclopedia about angels. Cassiel, played by Otto Sander in the original and Andre Braugher in the remake, watches with considerable ambivalence as his friend becomes human. In the sequel Faraway, So Close!, Cassiel himself becomes human. Nick Cave wrote "Cassiel's Song" as part of the music for that film.

See also
List of angels in theology
Zaphkiel

References 

Archangels
Archangels in Christianity
Archangel in Judaism
Angels in Islam
Individual angels